This is a list of Balliol College academics, teachers and visitors who are, or who have been, senior members of Balliol College, Oxford.

 Thomas Balogh, economist and member of the House of Lords
 Baruch Blumberg, doctor and co-recipient of the 1976 Nobel Prize in Physiology or Medicine, Master
 Charles Bowen, Baron Bowen, judge
 Judith M. Brown, historian
 Hedley Bull, scholar of International Relationas
 Lewis Campbell, classicist
 Roger Cashmore, experimental physicist
 Thomas Kelly Cheyne, divine
 Henry William Carless Davis, historian
 James Forder, economist
 Felix Frankfurter, judge
 Vivian Hunter Galbraith, historian
 Richard Gombrich
 Andrew Graham
 Jasper Griffin, classicist
 William Hardie
 Christopher Hill
 Philip N. Howard, sociologist
 Benjamin Jowett, theologian and Master
 Anthony Kenny
 Ralph Wheeler Robert Lingen, 1st Baron Lingen
 Colin Renshaw Lucas
 Oliver Lyne, classicist
 Bryan Magee
 Herman Merivale
 Oswyn Murray, classicist
 Denis Noble
 Linus Pauling, chemist
 Alvin Plantinga
 Arthur Prior
 Joseph Raz, philosopher of law
 Roy Ridley
 Adam Roberts
 Lyndal Roper
 William Charles Salter, last Principal of St Alban Hall
 Adam Smith
 Frederick Temple
 Rosalind Thomas, classicist
 Arnold Toynbee
 Arnold J. Toynbee
 Peter Tufano, social entrepreneur
 William George Ward
 Mike Woodin
 Heinrich Zimmer

References

Balliol College, academics